Timothy Lee Nolan (born February 5, 1947) is an American registered sex offender and former state district court judge, a former leader in the Republican Party and a former chairman of Donald Trump's presidential campaign in Campbell County, Kentucky. On February 9, 2018, he pleaded guilty to 19 counts of child sex trafficking and human trafficking; on February 11, 2018, he was sentenced to serve 20 years in prison.

Early life, family and education

Nolan received B.A. degrees in philosophy and geology from Thomas More College. He subsequently received his J.D. from Northern Kentucky University 
. Nolan has stated he worked on a truck loading dock to earn money during his college and graduate school years.

Career
Nolan was City Solicitor for Newport, Kentucky in 1976, and in that capacity Nolan "requested that Commonwealth Attorney Lou Ball investigate obscenity violations" against a local bookstore and theater.

Nolan served as a state district court judge in Campbell County, Kentucky from 1978 to 1986. He ran for the Kentucky Supreme Court in 1982, losing in the primary election.

Nolan has been one of the leaders of the Republican Party in Kentucky. In 2016, he was the Campbell County chairman of Donald Trump's presidential campaign, after receiving the personal support of Donald Trump early in 2016. As a member of the Republican Party identified with the Tea Party movement, and later as a supporter of Donald Trump, Nolan has often criticized the Republican leadership in Kentucky. River City News publisher Michael Monks described Nolan as an "outspoken and controversial" political figure in Kentucky.

In April 2016, Nolan unsuccessfully tried to remove and replace Senator and Majority Leader Mitch McConnell as a delegate to the 2016 Republican National Convention due to McConnell's lack of support for Trump. On May 17, 2016, Nolan was appointed by Governor Matt Bevin as one of the four members of the first Kentucky Boxing and Wrestling Commission for a term expiring in May 2019, but he was removed from office days later due to controversy over a social media post.  While he defended himself in the racism scandal, his lawyer admitted he "dressed up" in KKK costume "every year".

In August 2016, Nolan filed to run for a seat on the Campbell County School Board. He ran on a platform of "eliminating property tax revenue for schools gradually" and finding other ways to fund education, such as selling naming rights to schools, and advocated state-supported school vouchers and raising teacher salaries. Nolan won election to the school board in November 2016, defeating incumbent Rich Mason. Nolan was noted as continuing to serve on the school board when being "charged with human trafficking" on May 2, 2017, but resigned from the position on May 4 after being "indicted on nine felony and two misdemeanor counts".

Criminal charges

In 2017, Nolan was charged with 28 felonies, including charges of rape, human trafficking, witness tampering, prostitution, unlawful transaction with a minor and sodomy.  There were 22 victims, including eight juveniles.

Nolan initially pleaded not guilty to the charges on May 12, 2017. On February 9, 2018, at age 71, he pleaded guilty to 21 counts going back to 2004 and included 19 victims, including juveniles. The agreement called for 20 years in prison and to pay a $100K fine. He entered an Alford plea for some charges. The counts indicated he engaged in human trafficking, providing drugs and alcohol to minors in exchange for sex, and threatening arrest and eviction unless sex acts were performed. He is currently an inmate at Northpoint Training Center in the State of Kentucky.

Electoral history

References

1947 births
21st-century American criminals
Living people
Place of birth missing (living people)
American people convicted of child sexual abuse
American people convicted of drug offenses
Donald Trump 2016 presidential campaign
Kentucky politicians convicted of crimes
Kentucky Republicans
Kentucky state court judges
People who entered an Alford plea
American politicians convicted of sex offences
Salmon P. Chase College of Law alumni
Tea Party movement activists
Thomas More University alumni
People convicted of sex trafficking